KHS GmbH is a supplier of filling and packaging systems based in Dortmund, Germany. The company offers filling lines for glass and PET bottles, kegs, and cans for the beverage, food, and non-food industries, and is a wholly owned subsidiary of Salzgitter Klöckner-Werke GmbH, a member of Salzgitter AG.

History 

KHS GmbH was established in 1993 from a merger involving Holstein & Kappert AG of Dortmund (founded in 1868) and Seitz-Werke GmbH (founded in 1887), which later became SEN AG, Bad Kreuznach.

Timeline:

 1868: Holstein & Kappert (H&K) is founded in Dortmund, Germany
 1887: Seitz-Werke (later SEN) is founded in Bad Kreuznach, Germany
 1977-1982 H&K (100%) and SEN (90%) acquired by Klöckner-Werke AG, Duisburg, Germany
 1993: H&K and SEN merge to form KHS Maschinen- und Anlagenbau AG, Dortmund, Germany
 2007: Salzgitter AG acquires the majority share in Klöckner-Werke
 2008: KHS Corpoplast, KHS Plasmax, and KHS Moldtec are integrated into the Salzgitter Klöckner-Werke GmbH
 2010: KHS AG becomes KHS GmbH
 2011: KHS GmbH becomes a wholly owned subsidiary of Salzgitter Klöckner-Werke GmbH

Key figures
In 2012, the KHS Group employs a workforce of 4,178 employees worldwide. Annual sales totaled 1008 million euros in 2012.

Sales figures in recent years:
 2008: 986 million euros
 2009: 727 million euros
 2010: 918 million euros
 2011: 917 million euros
 2012: 980 million euros

Sales figures for 2012 by region:
 37.7% Europe 
 28.1% Americas
 20.1% CIS/Asia Pacific 
 14.0% Middle East/Africa

Sites
Headquarters of KHS GmbH is Dortmund, Germany, which is also the site of one of the company's five German production facilities. Other German production sites are located in Bad Kreuznach, Hamburg, Kleve, and Worms.

The product centers for washing and pasteurizing technology and labeling and inspection technology are based in Dortmund.

The Bad Kreuznach plant specializes in the following areas of beverage filling engineering including aseptic technology: Filtration, beverage blending technology, high-gravity brewing systems, flash pasteurizing and deaerating systems, and rinsing, filling, caps and lid feeding, and sealing technologies for bottles and cans. The product center for kegging technology is also located here.

At its site in Kleve, KHS manufactures packaging equipment with the focus on the latest in final packaging.

The activities of KHS' plant in Worms are centered on packing and unpacking systems and palletizing equipment.

KHS Corpoplast and KHS Plasmax in Hamburg are focused on stretch blow molding and barrier technologies and the development of new types of plastic bottle.

KHS GmbH's production facilities outside Germany are situated in Brazil (São Paulo), the United States (Waukesha, WI; Sarasota, FL), Mexico (Zinacantepec), India (Ahmedabad), and China (Suzhou). The company also has branches in 83 countries around the globe. KHS GmbH's internal sales organization, sales offices, and subsidiaries handle sales for all products manufactured at each of the production sites.

Areas of expertise

Turnkey lines
The turnkey lines manufactured by KHS GmbH offer systems for every branch of industry, every type of container, and every process in the production of beverages. The container types offered include glass and PET bottles, cans, and kegs. Each KHS line comprises the individual machines required to carry out all beverage production processes ranging from PET bottle production, filling, labeling, packing, and palletizing up to and including inspection and complete sanitizing.

Processing systems
Another core area of KHS GmbH involves processing systems for simplifying and designing complex beverage production processes more efficiently. The various processes pertain to sanitizing systems, beverage blending systems, and the design and configuration of production lines.

Management
The management of KHS GmbH:
 Kai Acker , Chief Executive Officer / Chief Technical Officer
 Martin Resch, Chief Financial Officer, Chief Human Resources Officer, Information Technology
 Prof. E.h. Dr.-Ing. Johann Grabenweger, Chief Sales Officer

Supervisory Board
The members of the Supervisory Board of KHS GmbH are
 Prof. Dr.-Ing. Heinz Jörg Fuhrmann, Salzgitter, Chairman
 Erich Bach, Frankfurt/Main, Vice Chairman
 Konrad Ackermann, Dortmund
 Burkhard Becker, Hattingen
 Karl Ehlerding, Hamburg
 Roland Flach, Kronberg im Taunus
 Heinz Groschke, Büchen
 Nina Kemmsies, Dortmund
 Michael Kiekbusch, Hildesheim
 Ulrike Kletezka, Dortmund
 Willi Kumm, Fürfeld
 Artur Schreiber, Dortmund

External links
Website of KHS GmbH 
Sustainability report of KHS GmbH 
Customer magazine competence 
https://dairy.khs.com/en/
https://pet.khs.com/en/
NMP Systems: Innovationen Powered by KHS™

References

Machine manufacturers
Manufacturing companies based in Dortmund